Chogo Lungma Glacier is a glacier in the Karakorum mountain ranges in Shigar District of Gilgit-Baltistan. It was the first of all the big Karakorum glaciers to be discovered, in 1835.

See also 
Baltoro Glacier 
Biafo Glacier 
Godwin-Austen Glacier
Kutiah Lungma Glacier

References 

Karakoram
Glaciers of Gilgit-Baltistan
Baltistan
Glaciers of the Karakoram